Lake Shore is a city in Cass County, Minnesota, United States. The population was 1,004 at the 2010 census. It is part of the Brainerd Micropolitan Statistical Area.

History
Lake Shore was incorporated in 1947.

Geography
County Roads 29, 77, 78, and 107 are the main routes in the community.

Demographics

2010 census
As of the census of 2010, there were 1,004 people, 451 households, and 322 families living in the city. The racial makeup of the city was 99.0% White, 0.3% African American, 0.1% Native American, 0.1% Asian, 0.1% from other races, and 0.4% from two or more races. Hispanic or Latino of any race were 0.9% of the population.

There were 451 households, of which 19.3% had children under the age of 18 living with them, 65.4% were married couples living together, 3.1% had a female householder with no husband present, 2.9% had a male householder with no wife present, and 28.6% were non-families. 23.9% of all households were made up of individuals, and 8.7% had someone living alone who was 65 years of age or older. The average household size was 2.23 and the average family size was 2.60.

The median age in the city was 51.5 years. 17.4% of residents were under the age of 18; 3.2% were between the ages of 18 and 24; 19.5% were from 25 to 44; 36.3% were from 45 to 64; and 23.9% were 65 years of age or older. The gender makeup of the city was 52.7% male and 47.3% female.

2000 census
As of the census of 2000, there were 966 people, 436 households, and 327 families living in the city. The racial makeup of the city was 98.76% White, 0.41% Native American, 0.10% Asian, 0.10% from other races, and 0.62% from two or more races. Hispanic or Latino of any race were 0.21% of the population.

There were 436 households, out of which 18.3% had children under the age of 18 living with them, 70.0% were married couples living together, 3.0% had a female householder with no husband present, and 25.0% were non-families. 20.6% of all households were made up of individuals, and 7.1% had someone living alone who was 65 years of age or older.  The average household size was 2.22 and the average family size was 2.54.

In the city, the population was spread out, with 16.4% under the age of 18, 3.5% from 18 to 24, 22.9% from 25 to 44, 37.6% from 45 to 64, and 19.7% who were 65 years of age or older.  The median age was 49 years. For every 100 females, there were 113.7 males.  For every 100 females age 18 and over, there were 114.3 males.

The median income for a household in the city was $51,500, and the median income for a family was $56,563. Males had a median income of $41,319 versus $24,688 for females. The per capita income for the city was $33,387.  About 2.5% of families and 4.5% of the population were below the poverty line, including 2.6% of those under age 18 and 7.3% of those age 65 or over.

References

External links
Lake Shore official website

Cities in Cass County, Minnesota
Cities in Minnesota
Brainerd, Minnesota micropolitan area